Charles Joye "Cherry Nose" Gioe (February 6, 1904 – August 18, 1954) was a lieutenant in the Chicago Outfit criminal organization and a partner in the Hollywood extortion scandals of the 1940s.

Biography

Charles Joey Gioe was born on February 6, 1904. He became a high-ranking lieutenant for the Chicago Outfit, specializing in extortion and blackmail, under Frank Nitti after Al Capone's 1931 tax evasion conviction.  In 1936, Gioe went to Des Moines, Iowa to expand syndicate operations.  He eventually returned to Chicago, leaving underboss Louis "Cock-Eyed Louie" Fratto in control of the Des Moines operations. During the mid-1930s, Gioe, Paul "The Waiter" Ricca and Louis "Little New York" Campagna, began financially supporting extortion operations by Willie Morris Bioff and George Brown against Hollywood movie studios.  In exchange for annual payoffs to the Outfit, the mob-controlled  projectionist unions would refrain from labor strikes and disruptions.

In the late 1930s, the extortion racket was busted by law enforcement. On March 18, 1943 Gioe, Ricca, and Campagna were indicted for extortion; Bioff and Browne agreed to testify against them. On December 31, 1943, Gioe was convicted of extortion and sentenced to ten years in prison. Gioe was later paroled (along with the other syndicate members) in 1947, despite protests from Senator Estes Kefauver. Upon his release, Gioe became second to Ricca and Campagna as the top Chicago syndicate leader.

On August 18, 1954, Charles Gioe was shot to death by mafia soldiers controlled by Joseph "Joey" Glimco after he accidentally interfered in a dispute Glimco was having with a contractor building a Howard Johnson's restaurant.

Notes

External links
Crime Magazine: The Guileless Gangster by Allan May
American Mafia.com: Charles “Cherry Nose” Gioe by Allen May
 Find a Grave Memorial for Charles Gioe

1954 deaths
Chicago Outfit mobsters
Mafia extortionists
Murdered American gangsters of Italian descent
People murdered in Illinois
Male murder victims
Deaths by firearm in Illinois
1904 births